The 2022 evacuation of the Donetsk People's Republic and the Luhansk People's Republic refers to mass evacuation of the residents of the self-proclaimed Donetsk People's Republic (DNR) and Luhansk People's Republic (LNR) to the Russian Federation starting in February 2022.  As of 22 March, almost 347,000 people had arrived in Russia from the DNR, LNR and Ukraine.

Evacuation 
On 18 February 2022, the leader of the DNR, Denis Pushilin, announced that DNR inhabitants were to evacuate to Russia due to the threat of attack from Ukraine. Later, Leonid Pasechnik, head of the LPR, did the same, and announced that the LNR civilian population was to be evacuated to Russia. However, Ukraine denied the allegations of starting an offensive against the two republics. The first train for the evacuation departed to Russia on 19 February. According to the Ministry of Emergency Situations in Russia, 50,000 evacuees from the Donbass had arrived in Russia in the first two days since the announcement of the evacuation.

Ukrainian authorities reported that most people in Donetsk and Luhansk did not leave their homes. Some people left due to fear, not the allegations of a Ukrainian offensive. Dmitry Peskov, the press secretary to Russian president Vladimir Putin, said that he had no information of what was happening in the DNR.

See also 
 Russian filtration camps of Ukrainians

References 

History of Luhansk Oblast
History of Donetsk Oblast
Prelude to the 2022 Russian invasion of Ukraine
Evacuations
February 2022 events in Ukraine
February 2022 events in Russia
Politics of the Luhansk People's Republic
Politics of the Donetsk People's Republic
Ukrainian refugees
False flag operations